St. Augustine's Church is an active Anglican church in Pendlebury, Greater Manchester, England. Dedicated to St Augustine, it is part of the benefice of Swinton and Pendlebury along with St Peter's Church in Swinton and All Saints' Church in Wardley. The church is in the Eccles deanery, the archdeaconry of Salford and the diocese of Manchester. The church was granted Grade II* listed status in 1966 but has since been upgraded to Grade I.

Called the "Miners' Cathedral", due to its almost cathedralesque stature, in the heart of a one time coal-mining community, it was also sometimes locally called "Gussie's".

The church is situated on Bolton Road and has a connected primary school.

History
Manchester banker, Edward Stanley Heywood of Heywood's Bank commissioned G. F. Bodley to design the church in March 1870. Its foundation stone was laid in the following September and it was consecrated in May 1874. Heywood paid for its construction, decoration and furnishings. The church was  constructed to the design of Bodley and Thomas Garner between 1871 and 1874. The cost, £3,300 (£ in ) was largely borne by Heywood.

Bodley designed a bell tower for the south-east side, higher than the main roof, but it was not built.

Architecture

Exterior
The church is built of red brick and has clay tile roof and stone dressings. It was inspired by the Gothic cathedrals in Albi and Toulouse in France. Its nave and chancel occupy ten bays under a continuous roof. The church has a door at the west end, a porch on the south side and vestry on the north. The bays are separated by shallow weathered buttresses that terminate in triangular gablets above the coped parapet which has pierced quatrefoils above the chancel. The nave and chancel are differentiated by their windows. The nave has three-light windows below blank arches while the chancel has four-light windows with reticulated tracery. The east window between angled buttresses topped by crocketted pinnacles has seven lights decorated with flowing reticulated tracery. The west window has five lights.

Interior

The church has large internal buttresses that are pierced by passage aisles and which support high-level arches. The barrel roof is richly painted above chancel. An elaborately carved rood screen separates the nave from the chancel and the sanctuary is raised. The reredos is decorated with painted figures. The organ case, rood screen and sedilia were designed by Bodley. The ornate font on a carved stone is raised from the ground by several steps, and above it is a carved wooden hood suspended from the walls.

Clergy
The first vicar, Doctor Alfred Dewes (b. Coventry 1825; d. Pendlebury 1911), was vicar from the consecration of the church in 1874 until his death in 1911. He worked unceasingly throughout the smallpox and cholera outbreaks, helping the poor and afflicted. Both vicar and church were the focal point for the mourning following the Clifton Hall Colliery explosion on 18 June 1885, in which 178 men and boys were killed.

Churchyard

Below the east window is a memorial to 64 victims of the Clifton Hall Colliery disaster who were buried in the churchyard. The churchyard also contains war graves of twelve service personnel of the Great War and four of the Second World War.

Reception
Nicholas Pevsner writing in the Buildings of England described the church as one of the greatest and most moving of all Victorian churches, with an interior of "breathtaking majesty and purity".

The church was the subject of drawings and paintings by artist L.S. Lowry who lived at 117 Station Road, Pendlebury, between 1909 and 1948.

Current condition
In recent years, several church restoration projects have been completed, including re-pointing southeast side and the addition of toilets and kitchen. 
The church is in need of at least £1 million for refurbishments to the interior roof and to repair the pointing on the exterior of the church, and is a priority project for English Heritage, who quote it as being "exceptionally important".

See also

 Grade I listed churches in Greater Manchester
 Listed buildings in Swinton and Pendlebury

External links 
Image of the church.
St. Augustine's C of E Primary School Website.

References 

Churches in the City of Salford
Pendlebury
Grade I listed churches in Greater Manchester
Churches completed in 1874
19th-century Church of England church buildings
Pendlebury
George Frederick Bodley church buildings